Robert Olmstead (born January 3, 1954) is an American novelist and educator.

Early life and education
Olmstead was born in 1954 in Westmoreland, New Hampshire. He grew up on a farm. After high school, he enrolled at Davidson College with a football scholarship, but left school after three semesters in which he compiled a poor academic record. He later attended Syracuse University, where he studied with Raymond Carver and Tobias Wolff and received both bachelor's and master's degrees, in 1977 and 1983, respectively.

Career

He was the former Director of Creative Writing at Ohio Wesleyan University and now serves as an emeritus faculty member at the university. He has also served as the Senior Writer in Residence at Dickinson College and as the director of creative writing at Boise State University. Olmstead teaches in the Low-Residency MFA program in creative writing at Converse College.

Olmstead is the author of the novels America by Land, A Trail of Heart's Blood Wherever We Go, Soft Water,  Far Bright Star  and Coal Black Horse. He is also the author of a memoir Stay Here With Me, as well as River Dogs, a collection of short stories, and the textbook Elements of the Writing Craft. He was the recipient of a Guggenheim Fellowship in 1989 and an NEA Literature Fellowship in 1993.

His novel Coal Black Horse (2007) has received national acclaim, including the 2007 Chicago Tribune Heartland Prize for Fiction and the 2008 Ohioana Book Award for Fiction; it was also selected for the "On the Same Page Cincinnati" reading program and the Choose to Read Ohio’s 2011 booklist.

Booklist has named his novel Far Bright Star (2009) (the second book in the Coal Black Horse trilogy) as one of the Top Ten Westerns of the Decade; the book also received the 2010 Western Writers of America Spur Award.  One reviewer praised Olmstead's ability to "translate nature's revelatory beauty into words", commenting that Coal Black Horse evokes what Henry David Thoreau described in Walden as "the indescribable innocence and beneficence of Nature"; by contrast, the Mexican desert of Far Bright Star is "the place of the sun shriveled and the dried up".  The Chicago Tribune review praised the authenticity of the imagery and experiences in Olmstead's writing, while also comparing his writing to that of Ernest Hemingway.  It noted the influence of contemporary events, such as the guerrilla warfare during the U.S. occupation of Fallujah during the Iraq War.

Works 

Olmstead's published works include:
 River Dogs (1987)
 Soft Water (1988)
 A Trail of Heart's Blood Wherever We Go (1990)
 America By Land (1993)
 Stay Here With Me (1997)
 Coal Black Horse (2007)
 Far Bright Star (2009)
 The Coldest Night (2012)
 Savage Country (2017)

References

External links 

Algonquin Books' Robert Olmstead web pages
Robert Olmstead on His Life as a Writer (audio of KBOO Community Radio interview, August 27, 2009)

20th-century American novelists
21st-century American novelists
American male novelists
1954 births
Living people
Ohio Wesleyan University faculty
Syracuse University alumni
Novelists from New Hampshire
20th-century American male writers
21st-century American male writers
Novelists from Ohio
People from Westmoreland, New Hampshire